The Annals of the Missouri Botanical Garden is a long-established major peer-reviewed journal of botany, established in 1914 by the Missouri Botanical Garden, under the directorship of botanist and phycologist, George Thomas Moore, and still published quarterly  by the Missouri Botanical Garden Press. The journal is often abbreviated Ann. Missouri Bot. Gard.

References

External links
 Annals of the Missouri Botanical Garden at SCImago Journal Rank
 Annals of the Missouri Botanical Garden at Botanical Scientific Journals
 Volumes 1-9 of Annals of the Missouri Botanical Garden at HathiTrust Digital Library
 Volumes 1-95 of Annals of the Missouri Botanical Garden at Biodiversity Heritage Library.
 Volumes 96-97 of Annals of the Missouri Botanical Garden at Biodiversity Heritage Library.

Botany journals
Publications established in 1914
Quarterly journals
Missouri Botanical Garden